The Victors is a 1963 British-American black-and-white war film written, produced and directed by Carl Foreman. He called it a "personal statement" about the futility of war. Both victor and vanquished are losers.

It follows a group of U.S. soldiers through Europe during the Second World War, from Britain in 1942, through the fierce fighting in Italy and the invasion of Normandy, to the uneasy peace of occupied Berlin. It is adapted from a collection of short stories called The Human Kind by English author Alexander Baron, based upon his own wartime experiences. The British characters were changed to Americans in order to appeal to American audiences.

The Victors features an all-star cast, with fifteen American and European leading players, including six actresses whose photographs appear on the posters — Melina Mercouri from Greece, Jeanne Moreau from France, Rosanna Schiaffino from Italy, Romy Schneider and Senta Berger from Austria and Elke Sommer from West Germany.

Plot
The story is told in a series of short vignettes, each having a beginning and an ending in itself, though all are connected to the others

A U.S. infantry squad is sent to Italy, including Sergeant Craig, and Corporals Trower and Chase, and GI Baker. The squad take possession of a small town in Sicily. Craig has to stop his men from looting. Baker strikes up a relationship with Maria, a young mother whose soldier husband is missing. They talk to a Sikh soldier who is lonely and misses his children. A group of white American soldiers find two black American soldiers in a bar and beat them until the MPs (Military Police) arrive; an Italian onlooker asks why Americans attack each other and gets no reply.

The squad are then sent to France. Craig spends the evening with a Frenchwoman who is terrified by bombing raids.

The men help liberate a concentration camp. In Ostend, Trower meets Regine, a violinist, and falls in love with her. However when he sees her later she is working for a pimp, Eldridge, who tells Trower that she rents by the hour.

One truckload of GIs is chosen out of a convoy to supply witnesses to the execution by firing squad of a GI deserter (inspired by the real-life 1945 execution of Private Eddie Slovik) in a huge, otherwise empty, snow-covered field near a chateau at Sainte-Marie-aux-Mines on Christmas Eve, accompanied by Frank Sinatra singing "Have Yourself a Merry Little Christmas", and then a chorus of "Hark! The Herald Angels Sing" after the fatal shots are fired. The New York Times film review stated "it stands out in stark and sobering contrast to the other gaudier incidents in the film". (This was an early example of "Soundtrack Dissonance", the juxtaposition of saccharine music with a frightful scene, and was emulated the following year by Stanley Kubrick in Dr. Strangelove, which was also shot in black and white.)

Chase has a relationship with Magda, who suggests he desert and join her in the black market. He refuses just as he learns that his unit is marching out of town in the rain. Some of his friends hide his gear under their rain ponchos, and he slips into formation. Back at the front he is wounded in the leg.

A newcomer to the squad, a misfit named Weaver, adopts a dog even though another man in the unit tells him that it is against regulations ("They're dirty and they make dirt"), and they can't take dogs with them when they redeploy at the front. Weaver keeps feeding the dog anyway, even after the other men kick him and his dog out of the tent. When the unit moves out, one of the other men in the unit, Grogan, tells Weaver to call his dog. Weaver thinks that the others have changed their minds and are letting him bring his dog with them, but Grover shoots the dog as it runs after the truck.

When Chase gets out of hospital in England, he is stuck at a bus stop in the rain. A man, Dennis, invites him to have tea with his family. He has a pleasant time, but when he visits Craig in the hospital, he discovers that most of Craig's face has been blown off.

The war in Europe ends. In 1946 Trower is still in the Army and stationed in Berlin. He is in love with Helga, a young German woman who was raped by the Russians during and after the Battle of Berlin. Trower brings her parents imported goods from the PX (military Post Exchange) when he visits their apartment and has sex with Helga in their bedroom. Helga's sister has been sleeping with Russians; her current lover, a Russian officer, has given her an expensive fur coat that she flaunts in front of Helga, their parents, and Trower. Trower is returning to his base when he meets a drunken Russian soldier. He thinks of Russians raping Helga and a provokes a fight with the Russian. The two men pull knives and stab each other to death. As the camera pulls back to show seemingly endless ruins, we see that the position of the allies' bodies suggests the letter 'V' for Victory.

Cast

Starring in alphabetical order
Vincent Edwards as Baker
Albert Finney as Russian soldier
George Hamilton as Trower
Melina Mercouri as Magda
Jeanne Moreau as Frenchwoman
George Peppard as Chase
Maurice Ronet as French lieutenant
Rosanna Schiaffino as Maria
Romy Schneider as Regine
Elke Sommer as Helga Metzger
Eli Wallach as Craig
and Michael Callan as Eldridge
Co-Starring
Peter Fonda as Weaver
Jim Mitchum as Grogan
Senta Berger as Trudi Metzger
With
Albert Lieven as Metzger
Mervyn Johns as Dennis
Tutte Lemkow as Sikh soldier
John Crawford as Captain
Peter Vaughan as Policeman
George Mikell as Russian sentry
Alf Kjellin as Priest
Russ Titus
Alan Barnes as Tom
John Rogers as British soldier
Marianne Deeming as Frau Metzger
Sean Kelly as Giggling Sergeant
Patrick Jordan as Tank sergeant
James Chase as Condemned soldier
Mickey Knox
Peter Arne
Malya Nappi as Barmaid
Veite Bethke
Milo Sperber as Camp prisoner
George Roubicek as Russian sentry
Bee Duffell as Joan (Uncredited)
The Squad [Firing squad members]
Riggs O'Hara
Charles De Temple
Al Waxman
Tom Busby
Robert Nichols
Graydon Gould
Larry Caringi
Ian Hughes
Anthony McBride

Songs listed in opening credits
"March of the Victors""Sweet Talk""No Other Man" by Sol KaplanFreddy Douglass
"My Special Dream" by Sol KaplanFreddy DouglassHoward Greenfield
"Does Goodnight Mean Goodby?" by Howard GreenfieldJack KellerGerry Goffin

Original novel
The film was based on the book The Human Kind, which was published in 1953. It was the third in a trilogy of autobiographical war works from Alexander Baron, the first two being From the City, From the Plough and There's No Home. The Human Kind was  a series of autobiographical notes and sketches which covered the war from 1939 to 1945, with an epilogue in Korea. The Independent called it "an ambitious collection of vignettes pitched between fiction and autobiography, short story and novel, which took pitiless stock of what the war had done to people and their sense of goodness or hope, political hope especially."

Production

Development
Film rights were bought by Carl Foreman. In May 1957, he announced a slate of productions he wanted to produce under a deal with Columbia in England, including an adaptation of The Human Kind.  The deal was for four films over three years, with a budget of $8–10 million. He called Human Kind a "series of vignettes of the early days of the blitz in England."

In 1960, Foreman announced The Human Kind would follow his production of The Guns of Navarone. Foreman's intention was to "select several of the stories, adapt them to the screen and make one overall drama out of the kaleidoscopic collection." Foreman also said he intended to make his directorial debut with the movie.

In August 1961, Foreman said the project would be titled The Victors as he felt the theme of the book was that in war the winners are also the losers. In February 1962, Foreman arrived in Los Angeles to cast the movie.

"It will be controversial and may well shock people, said Foreman in August 1962, just as filming began. "But it represents a deeply personal feeling I have about war and specifically heroism. People are very capable of coming up with heroism when it is necessary - but it's not a game anymore. What I resent is the need for heroism in warfare."

Sophia Loren and Simone Signoret were originally cast, but dropped out and were replaced by Jeanne Moreau and Rosanna Schiaffino.

Shooting
Filming began 7 August 1962, first in England, then Italy and France, then the unit returned to England.  Filming took place in Sweden, France, Italy and England.

Mercouri admitted in her memoirs that "I gave Carl Foreman a hard time" during the shoot but said this was because she was physically unwell.

Saul Bass created the opening montage and title sequence that covers European history from the First World War to the Battle of Britain in the Second World War. Bass's edit of historical footage in The Victors explicitly argues that the failures of World War I and its aftermath directly resulted in the rise of Fascism and World War II. Bass had previously gathered together much of the newsreel material for similar historical montages used in The Four Horsemen of the Apocalypse (1962).

Release

Censorship
The Victors was cut by about 20 minutes within a few weeks of opening. The version in circulation is 154 minutes (see Leonard Maltin's Film & Video Guide).

Among the sequences cut was one where an 11-year-old boy, Jean Pierre, propositions the American soldiers to exchange sex for food money. The Hollywood Production Code, also known as the Hays Code, insisted that several scenes be deleted. While the Code had been gradually liberalised in the 1950s-early 1960s, homosexuality was still something that could only be, vaguely, implied in order to get approval from the Hollywood Production Code and the Catholic Legion of Decency.

American film executives encouraged Foreman to include a nude scene with Elke Sommer, already in the version released in Europe and Britain, when he submitted it for a Production Code seal. This was to be used as a bargaining chip in case of any other objections. Foreman submitted the more modest version of the scene that had been shot for the American market and the film was passed without incident.

Box office
The film disappointed at the box office. George Hamilton argued it "was way too dark, foreshadowing the great paranoid movies of the later sixties, ahead of the bad times that seemed to begin with the Kennedy assassination."

Awards
Peter Fonda was nominated for a Golden Globe for Most Promising Newcomer.

Paperback novelization
In November 1963, Dell Publishing issued a novelization of the screenplay by critic, author and war veteran Milton Shulman. The book's presentation is idiosyncratic, as it is both unabashedly a tie-in edition, yet seems to cautiously sidestep labeling itself an adaptation of the script per se (though within Shulman's sensitively internalized retelling, it is quite faithful to the film's dialogue and structure). Both the cover and title page proclaim "Carl Foreman's The Victors" under which the byline is "by Milton Shulman, based on The Human Kind by Alexander Baron." bypassing mention of the actual screenplay. It is unknown whether Dell bid for the publishing rights and commissioned the novelization, or if Foreman engineered its publication. The latter would seem the more likely, given Foreman's possessive over-the-title billing, and that the short story collection providing the source of the screenplay is itself an established work of fiction. What does seem clear is that Baron himself was approached to write the novelization, and that he declined—possibly because, with the Americanization of the characters, he felt the novel's authorship should have a genuinely American voice—but nonetheless wanted to select the author and supervise. That he did so can be extrapolated from the copyright registration: The copyright is assigned to Baron, with a notation that he engaged Shulman to write the book as a work for hire. The resultant novelization sold well enough to earn at least a second print run, indicated on that identical edition's copyright page, issued in January 1964.

References

External links
 
 
 
 

1963 films
1963 war films
American black-and-white films
American war films
Anti-war films about World War II
British black-and-white films
British war films
Columbia Pictures films
Italian Campaign of World War II films
Films with screenplays by Carl Foreman
Western Front of World War II films
Films scored by Sol Kaplan
Films based on British novels
1960s English-language films
1960s American films
1960s British films